This is the production discography of The Runners.

Singles
2006: "Where Da Cash At" (Curren$y featuring Lil Wayne & Remy Ma)
2006: "Hustlin'" (Rick Ross)
2006: "Born-N-Raised" (DJ Khaled featuring Trick Daddy, Pitbull, & Rick Ross)
2007: "All The Above" (Beanie Sigel featuring R. Kelly)
2007: "Go Getta" (Young Jeezy featuring R. Kelly)
2007: "Bet That" (Trick Daddy featuring Chamillionaire & Gold Rush)
2007: "Dreamin'" (Young Jeezy featuring Keyshia Cole)
2007: "I'm So Hood" (DJ Khaled featuring Trick Daddy, Rick Ross, Plies, & T-Pain)
2007: "Slap" (Ludacris)
2007: "Speedin'" (Rick Ross featuring R. Kelly)
2008: "Cash Flow" (Ace Hood featuring T-Pain & Rick Ross)
2008: "Out Here Grindin" (DJ Khaled featuring Akon, Rick Ross, Plies, Lil Boosie, Trick Daddy, Ace Hood & Lil Wayne)
2008: "Baby Doll" (Girlicious)
2008: "Go Hard" (DJ Khaled featuring Kanye West & T-Pain)
2009: "Cause A Scene" (Teairra Mari featuring Flo Rida)
2009: "Overtime" (Ace Hood featuring Akon & T-Pain)
2009: "My Time"  (Fabolous featuring Jeremih) 
2009: "Champion" (Ace Hood featuring Rick Ross & Jazmine Sullivan)
2009: "Thinkin' About You"(Mario)
2009: "Fed Up" (DJ Khaled featuring Usher, Drake, Young Jeezy, & Rick Ross)
2010: "Hey Daddy (Daddy's Home)" (Usher featuring Plies)
2010: "Lowkey Poppin" (Kid Ink)
2011: "California King Bed" (Rihanna)
2011: "I Get Money" (Birdman featuring T-Pain, Lil Wayne & Mack Maine)
2011: "Swagger Jagger" (Cher Lloyd)
2011: "Cheers (Drink to That)" (Rihanna)
2012: "Take It to the Head" (DJ Khaled)
2013: "Ready" (Fabolous featuring Chris Brown)
2017: "Sounds Good To Me" (Nelly)

Songs

2005
Lil Wayne - Tha Carter II (2005)
03. "Money on My Mind"

Fat Joe - All or Nothing (2005)
02. "Does Anybody Know"

2006

Rick Ross - Port of Miami 
09. "Where My Money (I Need That)"
11. "Hit U From the Back" (featuring Rodney)
14. "It's My Time" (featuring Lyfe Jennings)
16. "Hustlin' (Remix)" (featuring Young Jeezy & Jay-Z)

Jim Jones - Hustler's P.O.M.E. (Product of My Environment) 
05. "Reppin' Time"

Lil Scrappy - Bred 2 Die - Born 2 Live
08."Anutha Country Story" (featuring Playboy Tre & Bo Hagon)

Fat Joe - Me, Myself & I 
04. "No Drama (Clap & Revolve)"

Trick Daddy - Back by Thug Demand (2006)
02. "Breaka, Breaka"

2007
Chris Brown - Exclusive 
08. "Damage"

UGK - UGK (Underground Kingz)
10. "Take tha Hood Back"  (feat. Slim Thug, Vicious & Middle Fingaz)

T.I. - T.I. vs. T.I.P. 
11. "We Do This"
13. "Don't You Wanna Be High"

DJ Khaled - We the Best
08. "Hit 'Em Up" (feat. Paul Wall & Bun B)
13. "The Streets" (feat. Shareefa & Willy Northpole)
00. "I'm So Hood (Remix)" (feat. T-Pain, Young Jeezy, Ludacris, Busta Rhymes, Big Boi, Lil Wayne, Fat Joe, Birdman & Rick Ross)

R. Kelly - Double Up 
01. "The Champ" (Co-Produced with R. Kelly) (feat. Swizz Beatz)
22. "Good Sex" (Co-Produced with R. Kelly) (feat. Twista) (iTunes Bonus Track)

Trey Songz - Trey Day 
04. "No Clothes On"

Chamillionaire - Ultimate Victory 
11. "Come Back to the Streets"

Keyshia Cole - Just Like You 
02. "Didn't I Tell You" (feat. Too Short)

DJ Drama - Gangsta Grillz: The Album 
17. "Aye" (feat. Young Dro & Big Kuntry King)

2008

Day26 - Day26 
07. "Come In (My Door's Open)"

Ace Hood - Gutta 
02. "Can't Stop" (feat. Akon)

Lil Mama - VYP (Voice of the Young People) 
03. "One Hit Wonder" (feat. DJ Khaled)

Blood Raw - My Life: The True Testimony 
13. "I Miss You"

Alfamega - I Am Alfamega
00. "G-Code" (feat. Young Jeezy)

Danity Kane - Welcome to the Dollhouse 
08. "Ecstasy" (feat. Rick Ross)

Rocko - Self Made 
09. "That's My Money" (feat. KC)
   
DJ Khaled - We Global 
04. "Go Ahead" (feat. Fabolous, Flo Rida, Fat Joe, Rick Ross & Lloyd)
07. "We Global" (feat. Trey Songz, Fat Joe & Ray J)

Girlicious - Girlicious 
03. "Liar Liar" (feat. Flo Rida)
06. "Already Gone"

Ludacris - Theater of the Mind 
01. "Intro"

Keyshia Cole - A Different Me 
03. "Please Don't Stop"

Mario Winans - Untitled 
00. What Can I Do

2009
Teairra Mari - At That Point 
00. "Cause A Scene Remix" (feat. Flo Rida, Rick Ross)

Trae - Streets Advocate 
04. "What Have I Become"

Rick Ross - Deeper Than Rap 
08. "Lay Back" (feat. Robin Thicke)
11. "Bossy Lady" (feat. Ne-Yo)
14. "In Cold Blood" (feat. Bang 'Em Smurf)

Ace Hood - Ruthless 
04. "Overtime" (feat. Akon & T-Pain)
05. "Champion" (feat. Jazmine Sullivan & Rick Ross)
06. "Love Somebody"  (Featuring Jeremih)
10. "Wifey Material"  (Featuring Lloyd)

Lil' Boosie - Superbad: The Return of Boosie Bad Azz 
01. "My Avenue (feat. Lil' Phat & Lil' Trill)"

Trick Daddy - Finally Famous: Born a Thug, Still a Thug 
03. "Da Realest (feat. Kevin Cossom)"

Lloyd - Like Me: The Young Goldie EP
00. "Pusha"  (feat. Lil Wayne & Juelz Santana)

Akon 
00. "New York City"

Chris Brown - Graffiti 
05. "What I Do"  (feat. Plies)

Usher - Raymond vs. Raymond 
00. "Take That" (leftover track)

Wyclef Jean - From the Hut, To the Projects, To the Mansion 
11. "We Made It"

Lil Scrappy - Tha Grustle 
06. "Posted"

RichGirl - RichGirl 
00. "Selfish"

Inkwell - Inkwell
00. "Invisible"
00. "Therapy"

Rico Love - Rico Love 
00. "Come Home To You"

Krave 
00. "Don't Get It"

Mary J. Blige - Stronger with Each Tear 
01. "Tonight"

Nu Jerzey Devil - The Introduction 
08. "Dangerous"

Beyoncé - Unreleased
00. "Crack The Case/Catch A Case" (Writers: Beyoncé Knowles, The Runners, Kiki Shread)  (Featuring Kiki Shread)

2010
Flo Rida 
00. "Star"

Jessica Jarrell 
00. "Up and Running"

Nipsey Hussle 
00. "Here Goes Nothing" (feat. KC)

Alley Boy 
00. "Introduction To Definition of F*ck Shit"

Justin Bieber - My World 2.0
11. " Kiss and Tell " (bonus track)

Trey Songz 
00. "Make Moves"
00. "Trey Day"
 
Mann 
00. "So Wavey"

Ludacris - Battle of the Sexes 
10. "B.O.T.S Radio"  (feat. Shawnna & I-20)

DJ Khaled - Victory
08. "Killing Me"  (feat. Buju Banton, Busta Rhymes & Bounty Killer)
09. "Bringing Real Rap Back"  (feat. Rum)
11. "On My Way"  (feat. Kevin Cossom, Bali, Ace Hood, BallGreezy, Ice Berg, Desloc, Gunplay, Rum & Young Cash)

Rick Ross - The Albert Anastasia EP 
06. "Fire Hazard"

Rick Ross - Teflon Don (album)
12. "Audio Meth" (feat. Raekwon)

Ce Ce Segarra 
00. "Damsel in Distress"

J-Bar 
00. "What's Up" (feat. Waka Flocka Flame)

DJ Freddy Fed 
00. "Sell Out Everything" (feat. Young Buck, Murphy Lee & Gunplay)

Akon - Akonic 
00. "Give It To 'Em" (feat. Rick Ross)

Lisa Maffia - Miss Boss 
02. "Hardrive"

Nelly - 5.0 
11. "Liv Tonight" (feat. Keri Hilson)

2011

Billy Blue - Blumanatti 
03. "Ball 4 Eva"

Torch - U.F.O. 
07. "Gone"

Cher Lloyd - Cher Lloyd 
00. "Swagger Jagger"

T.I. - Unreleased 
00. "We Dont Get Down Like Y'all" (feat. B.o.B)

DJ Khaled - We the Best Forever 
11. "A Million Lights" (feat. Kevin Rudolf, Tyga, Mack Maine, Jae Millz & Cory Gunz)

Kelly Rowland - Here I Am 
07. "All Of The Night" (feat. Rico Love)

Ace Hood - Blood, Sweat & Tears 
08. "Beautiful" (feat. Kevin Cossom)

Kevin Cossom - By Any Means
12. "All I Wanna Do"

Lloyd
00. "Superhero"
00. "Playboy Centerfold"

Bali
07. "Mary Jane" (feat. Kevin Cossom)

Karmin
00. "Crash Your Party"

Trey Songz 
00. "Its Gon Be On" (feat. Rico Love)

Nicole Scherzinger - Killer Love 
00. "Tomorrow Never Dies" (Bonus Track)

2012
Ace Hood - Starvation
10. "Promises" (feat. Kevin Cossom)

DJ Khaled - Kiss The Ring
10. "Don't Pay 4 It" (feat. Wale, Tyga, Mack Maine and Kirko Bangz)

Chris Brown - Fortune
07. "Biggest Fan"
21. "Do It Again" (UK and Ireland Deluxe Edition only)

Flo Rida - Wild Ones
10. "Louder" (Japanese Deluxe Edition only)

Rita Ora - ORA
03. "How We Do (Party)"

Tamia - Beautiful Surprise
 01. "Lose My Mind"
 04. "Believe In Love"
 08. "Him"

Lupe Fiasco - Food & Liquor II: The Great American Rap Album Pt. 1
09. "Heart Donor" (feat. Poo Bear)
12. "Brave Heart" (feat. Poo Bear)

2013

Ace Hood - Trials & Tribulations
19. Thugs Fall (feat. Kevin Cossom) (Best Buy deluxe edition only)

Rich Gang - Rich Gang
11. "Panties to the Side" (featuring French Montana, Tyga, Bow Wow & Gudda Gudda)

John Legend - Love in the Future
08. "Save the Night" (produced with Dave Tozer and Jon David Anderson)

2014

Kid Ink - My Own Lane
05. "We Just Came to Party" (feat. August Alsina)

Future - Honest
01. "Look Ahead"

Kevin McCall - A.D.H.D.
03. "Match One"

Young Money - Young Money: Rise of an Empire
06. "One Time" (featuring Lil Twist, YG, and Tyga) (produced with Jess Jackson)

Kevin Gates - By Any Means
10. "Arm And Hammer" (produced with The Monarch)

Production discographies
Discographies of American artists
Hip hop discographies